LIM zinc finger domain containing 2 is a protein that in humans is encoded by the LIMS2 gene.

Function

This gene encodes a member of a small family of focal adhesion proteins which interacts with ILK (integrin-linked kinase), a protein which effects protein-protein interactions with the extraceullar matrix. The encoded protein has five LIM domains, each domain forming two zinc fingers, which permit interactions which regulate cell shape and migration. A pseudogene of this gene is located on chromosome 4. Multiple transcript variants encoding different isoforms have been found for this gene. [provided by RefSeq, Nov 2011].

References

Further reading